In data management,  semantic warehousing is a methodology of digitalized text data using similar functions to Data warehousing (DW), such as ETL(Extract, transform, load), ODS(Operational data store), and MODEL. Key value operation is less useful for the digitalized text. Semantic warehousing is different from DW in that semantic information base from text(semantic) data.

Semantic warehousing is different from search engine in that semantic information base from text data is stored in the database.(DBMS)

Though data is most important word in computing era, it can not explain human knowledge well yet.
Data(numeric data) is key element of computing systems for certain organization (especially companies, enterprises), but no performance oriented organization needs something to gather and use knowledge or human feeling.
Semantic warehousing will be equally or more important than data warehousing in the future.

Definition
Semantic warehousing is a conceptual and functional term meaning to gather from a source, semantically defining and providing information from digitalized text type data.

Background

Data warehousing (DW) is popular these days. Gathering data from systems that generate transactions, data warehouses become a base of information. Key of data warehouse is a model (called datamart) and that model is made up of dimensions(key) and measures(value). Users get information from the models by doing certain operations. Online analytical processing (OLAP) is the most important operation for the users to get information from the DW models. Handling dimensions with pivoting, drilling, slice & dice operations users get numeric values like sales amounts, growth rates, etc.
Various areas of this world defined and appeared on the World Wide Web (Internet), eager to present their contents in a semantic way. 
Briefly speaking, semantic warehousing has datawarehousing body and search head and ontology features.

Data warehousing contributed to companies' business values and many solutions and tools are commercially successful. Analysis of internal data delivers a certain level of business values, on the contrary to this Semantic warehousing environment has not yet matured. Capacity of social data is increasing rapidly and various efforts of finding value from that data are made widely known as Big data, etc. Semantic warehousing can be the mainstream of treat data and intelligence of social world in the future though it is defined with other keywords.

At the Big data era, semantic processing is going to become major IT process. Semantic warehousing is digital infra of Intelligence.

Practices 

▣ Medical area (Clinical Information)

Some hospital implement semantic warehousing for clinical information (SWCI). Medical information is now knowledge network level. UMLS define semantic knowledge network of medical language. Currently medical information stored in database and not fully used for clinic. Semantic warehousing is next stage of digitalized medical information.

SWCI is a name of conceptual system of clinical information.
Named by Juhan Kim (SNUH, Seoul National University Hospital) and Bohyon Hwang, YongChan Keum in 2008.

Defined architecture on SWCI ;
1. Semantic-oriented cleansing
2. Semantic-oriented meta management
3. Clinical(Medical) knowledge basement
4. Semantic-oriented user intelligence

▣ Intelligence Area

At the point of Big data usage, intelligence reporting can be valuable results.

1. Source information
2. Manage intelligence & Semantic data
3. Intelligence service & use

http://www.globalintelligence.kr/gibigdata/

Connected area 

- Big data 
- Semantic web 
- Ontology 
- Knowledge 
- Medical and healthcare : EMR (Electronic Medical Record), EHR (Electronic Health Record)
- Data warehouse 
- AI (artificial intelligence)

References 
BI Laboratory of Seoul National University Hospital
Smith, Barry Kumar, Anand and Schulze-Kremer, Steffen (2004) Revising the UMLS Semantic Network, in M. Fieschi, et al. (eds.), Medinfo 2004, Amsterdam: IOS Press, 1700.
 Foundations of Data Warehouse Quality :
  Data Quality article mentioning that semantically rich DW.
  
 An Integrative and Uniform Model for Metadata Management in Data Warehousing Environment.
  Semantic metadata and technical metadata.
  http://ftp.informatik.rwth-aachen.de/Publications/CEUR-WS/Vol-19/paper12.pdf

 Effective Query Expansion using Condensed UMLS Metathesaurus for Medical Information Retrieval
http://www.e-hir.org/journal/view.html?uid=201&start=&sort=&scale=&key=all&oper=&key_word=UMLS&year1=&year2=&Vol=&Num=&PG=&book=&mod=vol&sflag=&sub_box=Y&aut_box=Y&sos_box=&pub_box=Y&key_box=&abs_box=&year=

 A Study of Effective Unified Medical Language System Concept Indexing in Radiology Reports
http://www.e-hir.org/journal/view.html?uid=226&start=&sort=&scale=&key=all&oper=&key_word=UMLS&year1=&year2=&Vol=&Num=&PG=&book=&mod=vol&sflag=&sub_box=Y&aut_box=Y&sos_box=&pub_box=Y&key_box=&abs_box=&year=

 Developing a Reference Terminology Model for Health Care Using an Object-Oriented Approach
http://www.e-hir.org/journal/view.html?uid=311&start=&sort=&scale=&key=all&oper=&key_word=UMLS&year1=&year2=&Vol=&Num=&PG=&book=&mod=vol&sflag=&sub_box=Y&aut_box=Y&sos_box=&pub_box=Y&key_box=&abs_box=&year=

 UMLS(Unified Medical Language System)의 증상용어와 국내의무기록에서 사용되는 증상용어와의 비교연구
http://www.e-hir.org/journal/view.html?uid=922&start=&sort=&scale=&key=all&oper=&key_word=UMLS&year1=&year2=&Vol=&Num=&PG=&book=&mod=vol&sflag=&sub_box=Y&aut_box=Y&sos_box=&pub_box=Y&key_box=&abs_box=&year=

Data management